A  of Japan was a category of cities in Japan in operation until 2015. Each special city had a population of at least 200,000, and was delegated functions normally carried out by prefectural governments. Those functions were a subset of the ones delegated to core cities.

The category of special cities was established by the Local Autonomy Law, article 252 clause 26. They were designated by the Cabinet after a request by a city council and a prefectural assembly.

Because the level of autonomy delegated to special cities was similar to that for core cities, after consultation with local governments the category of special cities was abolished in the revision of the Local Autonomy Act enacted on April 1, 2015. Cities with a population of at least 200,000 may now apply to be directly promoted to core city status. Special cities that have not been promoted may still retain autonomy, and are called , but this is regarded as a temporary arrangement. 

The special cities were not the same as the special wards of Tokyo. They were also different from the special (designated) cities (特別市, tokubetsu-shi) that were legally established under the Local Autonomy Law between 1947 and 1956, in an arrangement that was never implemented. They would have been prefecture-independent cities (in an analogous way, special wards are city-independent wards). They were the legal successors to the 1922 "six major cities" (roku daitoshi; only five were left in 1947 as Tokyo City had been abolished in the war) and precursors to the 1956 designated major cities that have expanded autonomy, but not full independence from prefectures.

List of special cities

As of 2015, when the category was abolished, 23 cities had been designated special cities:

References

External links
  "Japan's Evolving Nested Municipal Hierarchy: The Race for Local Power in the 2000s," by A.J. Jacobs at Urban Studies Research, Vol. 2011 (2011); doi:10.1155/2011/692764
 "Large City System of Japan"; graphic shows special cities compared with other Japanese city types at p. 1 [PDF 7 of 40]
 "Growth in Second Tier Cities - Urban Policy Lessons from Japan" briefing by CLAIR London on classes of Japanese cities (PDF)

Subdivisions of Japan